Mitrovica, is a city and municipality in northern Kosovo.[a] The Municipality of Mitrovica is going through territorial administrative restructuring. Since 2013 two administrative units at the municipal level of authority were created separating the city of Mitrovica in two municipalities; northern and southern Mitrovica. The city is multi-ethnic though Albanians form the absolute majority. The Serbs are heavily concentrated in the north of the city across the River Ibar, an area known as North Mitrovica.

Current population
According to the 2011 Census conducted by the Kosovo Statistics Agency, Southern Mitrovica has a population of 71,909.

Its ethnic composition is made of Albanians 69,497, Ashkali 647, Roma 528, Turks 518, Bosniaks 416, Gorani 23, Serbs 14, Egyptians 6 and others 43.

Geographical division
In the table below are presented the data on gender and composition of population distribution in rural and urban areas.

Population structure
Population structure according to the 2011 census is a presented below.

The first table expresses the population structure that mostly do not participate in the labor force. As well are presented the structure of youth and children that shows the population in the years to come.

On the following two tables is shown the population structure on gender based according to the census.

The labor force in Mitrovica consist of 46,484 people of both genders as well the numerical separation of rural and urban inhabitants able to work is presented.

Language
In Republic of Kosovo official languages are Albanian and Serbian. 
As an addition, according to its need on municipality level other languages such as Turkish, Bosnian and Roma are official languages.

References

Mitrovica, Kosovo
Mitrovica